No. 1 Photographic Reconnaissance Unit (or  1 PRU) was a flying unit of the Royal Air Force, first formed in 1940.

History

On 24 September 1939, the Royal Air Force formally took over the "Heston Flight", a civilian photo reconnaissance unit headed by Sidney Cotton based at Heston Aerodrome. The unit had previously been contracted by MI6 to perform clandestine photographic reconnaissance over Europe, using civilian-registered Lockheed 12A aircraft. The Flight was redesignated several times, first on 1 November 1939 as No. 2 Camouflage Unit, then on 17 January 1940 as the Photographic Development Unit, then on 18 June 1940 the Photographic Reconnaissance Unit, and finally on 14 November 1940, No. 1 Photographic Reconnaissance Unit.

The unit was equipped with a variety of aircraft modified for the photographic reconnaissance role, including Supermarine Spitfires, Bristol Blenheims, Lockheed Hudsons and de Havilland Mosquitos.

On 18 October 1942, 1 PRU was disbanded and the individual Flights of the Unit were redesignated as five separate squadrons, Nos. 540, 541, 542, 543 and 544 Squadrons.

On 1 June 1982, the Unit was revived at RAF Wyton when No. 39 Squadron was disbanded and some of its English Electric Canberra PR.9 reconnaissance aircraft were transferred to a newly formed No. 1 Photographic Reconnaissance Unit. The Unit reverted to its previous identity on 1 July 1992, when it was renumbered No. 39 (1 PRU) Squadron.

The photographic archive of 1 PRU was incorporated into the Allied Central Interpretation Unit and held at the Print Library at RAF Medmenham before its move to Keele University. Since 2008 it has been part of the archive of the National Collection of Aerial Photography.

See also 
 MI4

References

Notes

Bibliography

 Ashworth, Chris. RAF Coastal Command, 1936-1969. Sparkford, Somerset, UK: Patrick Stephens Ltd., 1992. .
 Bowyer, Michael J.F. and John D.R. Rawlings. Squadron Codes, 1937-56. Cambridge, UK: Patrick Stephens Ltd., 1979. .
 Flintham, Vic and Andrew Thomas. Combat Codes: A full explanation and listing of British, Commonwealth and Allied air force unit codes since 1938. Shrewsbury, Shropshire, UK: Airlife Publishing Ltd., 2003. .
 Jefford, C.G. RAF Squadrons, a Comprehensive record of the Movement and Equipment of all RAF Squadrons and their Antecedents since 1912. Shrewsbury, Shropshire, UK: Airlife Publishing, 1988 (second edition 2001). .
 Lake, Alan. Flying Units of the RAF: The ancestry, formation and disbandment of all flying units from 1912. Shrewsbury, Shropshire, UK: Airlife Publishing, 1999. .
Nesbit, Roy Conyers. 1996. Eyes of the RAF. Sutton Publishing

External links
 RAF Reconnaissance Aircraft Part 1
 RAF WWII Reconnaissance Units
 39 (1 PRU) Squadron / Canberra
 National Collection of Aerial Photography
 RAF Post WW2 Reconnaissance Aircraft

1 PRU
Military units and formations established in 1940
Military units and formations disestablished in 1992